The 1991 U.S. Figure Skating Championships took place at the Target Center in Minneapolis, Minnesota. Medals were awarded in four colors: gold (first), silver (second), bronze (third), and pewter (fourth) in six disciplines – men's singles, ladies' singles, pair skating, ice dancing, men's figures and ladies's figures – across three levels: senior, junior, and novice.

The event determined the U.S. teams for the 1991 World Championships.

Senior results

Men

Men's figures

Ladies

Ladies' figures

Pairs
(incomplete standings)

Ice dancing

Junior results

Men

Men's figures

Ladies

Ladies' figures

Pairs

Ice dancing

Novice Results

Novice Men’s Free Skating

Novice Men’s Figures

Novice Ladies’ Free Skating

Novice Ladies’ Figures

References
Novice Results: USFSA Skating Magazine April 1991 pages 27-28

External links
 Men's and ladies' results

U.S. Figure Skating Championships
U.S. Championships
Figure Skating Championships
U.S. Figure Skating Championships
U.S. Figure Skating Championships